Baron Marie Camille Louis de Gonzague Ghislain (Camille) de Tornaco (6 April 1807 – 8 March 1880) was a Belgian landowner and liberal politician.

He was born in Steinfort, Luxembourg.  He was a member of the provincial council of Liège, a member of the Belgian parliament and President of the Belgian Senate from 11 November 1879 until 8 March 1880.  He died in Brussels.

See also
 Liberal Party
 Liberalism in Belgium

Sources
 Camille de Tornaco
 Mémorial de la Province de Liège 1836-1986, Liège, p. 187.
 De Paepe, Jean-Luc, Raindorf-Gérard, Christiane (ed.), Le Parlement Belge 1831-1894. Données Biographiques, Brussels, Académie Royale de Belgique, 1996, p. 246.
 Douxchamps, José, Présence nobiliaire au parlement belge (1830–1970). Notes généalogiques, Wépion-Namen, José Douxchamps, 2003, p. 131.

1807 births
1880 deaths
People from Steinfort
Presidents of the Senate (Belgium)
Vice-presidents of the Senate (Belgium)
Barons of Belgium